Choji or  Chōji may refer to:

 Chōji (長治), a Japanese era from 1104 to 1106
 Choji Akimichi, a character from the manga and anime series Naruto
 Choji Station, a commuter railway station in Ansan, South Korea
 Sambo Choji, Nigerian footballer striker
 Izakaya Chōji, Japanese film director